The Divisione Calcio a 5 is the organization controlling the Futsal in Italy.

Controlling competition

Men's
 Serie A1
 Serie A2
 Serie B
 Coppa Italia Serie A
 Final Eight of coppa Italia Serie A2
 Final Eight of coppa Italia Serie B
 Supercoppa Italiana
 Campionato Nazionale Under 21 (216 teams)
 Final Eight of coppa Italia Under 21
 Fasi Nazionali dei Tornei Regionali (Young, Coppa Italia Regionale)

Women's
 Fasi nazionali dei tornei Femminili di Calcio a 5

External links
Sito Ufficiale della Divisione C/5
www.ilcalcioa5.com 

Futsal in Italy